The Assaouas Formation, also referred to as the Assaouas Sandstone is a Late Jurassic geologic formation in Niger. Fossil sauropod tracks have been reported from the formation.

See also 
 List of dinosaur-bearing rock formations
 List of stratigraphic units with sauropodomorph tracks
 Sauropod tracks
 Lists of fossiliferous stratigraphic units in Africa
 List of fossiliferous stratigraphic units in Niger
 Geology of Niger

References

Bibliography

Further reading 
 L. Ginsburg, A. F. d.e. Lapparent, B. Loiret and P. Taquet. 1966. Empreintes de pas de Vertébrés tétrapodes dans le séries continentales à l’Ouest d’Agadès (République du Niger) [Tetrapod vertebrate footprints in the continental series west of Agadez (Republic of Niger)]. Comptes Rendus de l'Académie des Sciences, Série D 263:28-31

Geologic formations of Niger
Jurassic System of Africa
Middle Jurassic Africa
Mesozoic Niger
Sandstone formations
Ichnofossiliferous formations
Paleontology in Niger
Formations